The Dos Porcos River is a river of Santa Catarina state in southeastern Brazil.

See also
List of rivers of Santa Catarina

References
 Map from Ministry of Transport

Rivers of Santa Catarina (state)